Richard  Babington (b Derry 4 February  1869 -  d Ipswich 11 December 1952) was Dean of Cork from 1914 to 1951.
 
Babington was educated at Foyle College and Trinity College, Dublin and ordained in 1892. After a curacy at Drumragh he was the Rector of Moville.

His son was Archdeacon of Exeter from 1958 to 1970.

References

1869 births
Clergy from Derry (city)
Alumni of Trinity College Dublin
People educated at Foyle College
Deans of Cork
1952 deaths
Richard